Tune may refer to:

Music
 Tune (folk music), a piece of short instrumental music, usually with repeating sections, and often played a number of times
 Melody
 Song
 Tune-family

People 
Clayton Tune (born 1999), American football player
David Tune (born 1954), Australian public servant
Dire Tune (born 1985), Ethiopian distance runner
Tommy Tune (born 1939), American actor, dancer, singer, theatre director, producer, and choreographer

Places
 Tune, Denmark
 Tune, Norway

Other uses
 The Tune, a 1992 animated film by Bill Plympton
 Tune Pakistan, video sharing website, also known by its domain name tune.pk
 Tune Ventures, a Malaysian investment company

See also
 
 
 Looney Tunes, a Warner Bros. animated cartoon series
 Tone (disambiguation)
 Toon (disambiguation)
 Tuner (disambiguation)
 Tunes (disambiguation)
 Tuning (disambiguation)